Royalstar or Rongshida is a Chinese brand of home appliances owned by the Hefei State-owned Assets Management Holdings Co., Ltd, a branch of Hefei State-owned Assets Supervision and Administration Commission (SASAC).

The history of Rongshida dates back to 1954. The brand named 'Rongshida' was founded in 1993. From 1995, Rongshida had been the highest selling brand in the Chinese market for washing machines for four consecutive years. Rongshida began to produce refrigerators in 1998. Washing machines and refrigerators were the main products of Rongshida during its flourishing time.

Since the 21st century, Rongshida has experienced ups and downs and lost its leading position in the Chinese market of major appliances. In 2011, the liquidation and cancellation of Rongshida as a corporate entity was finished. However, some authorized companies still have the right to use the brand and the trademark of Rongshida.

History 
Rongshida grew out of the Hardware & Iron Foundry of Hefei West District, which was founded in 1954 in Hefei, Anhui. After several mergers, the factory began producing washing machines in 1980. In 1986, Chen Rongzhen took over the company as the factory director and reformed the producing system of the factory, which turned around the gloomy situation caused by poor operation of that time. In 1990, the factory became the fourth largest manufacturer of washing machines in China.

On 8 October 1992, the factory founded a joint venture named Rongshida Electric Co, Ltd. with Hongkong Fengshida Investment Co, Ltd. and Anhui Import & Export Company. On 30 December 1992, the first Rongshida refrigerator was produced. On 1 January 1993, Rongshida as a brand was officially launched. In cooperation with the Japanese company Sanyo Electric Co., Ltd., Rongshida founded a joint venture named Hefei Rongshida Sanyo Electric Co., Ltd. In the following years, Rongshida earned the certifications of 'China Well-known Trademark', 'National Free-inspection Product' and 'China Top Brand'.

In order to expand the category of its products, Rongshida Group founded another six joint ventures with Maytag Corporation and Hong Kong ECRIEE Electronics Co., Ltd. In April 2002, Rongshida registered its English trademark 'Royalstar'. Three months later, Chen Rongzhen, who had been in charge of Rongshida for 16 years, resigned.

In May 2004, all the shares of Rongshida's joint venture with Maytag was purchased by Midea Group. Four years later, with a large-scale reform of state-owned enterprises in Hefei, Rongshida Group began its restructuring. The state-owned shares being gradually transferred, Rongshida became unable to run its business. After its cancellation, Rongshida brand was marginalized under the control of Midea Group, which led to its constantly declining market shares. In 2012, the market share of Rongshida washing machines reached only 1.67%.

On 6 November 2014, the Whirlpool Corporation, the biggest producer of home appliances worldwide, completed its acquisition of Rongshida Sanyo. On 9 December of the same year, Rongshida Sanyo was officially renamed Whirlpool China.

Authorized users of the Rongshida brand 
Whirlpool China Co., Ltd.

Its predecessor company was founded in 1994. Currently, Whirlpool China has the right to label its refrigerators, washing machines and microwave ovens with the four brands belonging to Rongshida: Whirlpool, Sanyo, DIQUA and Rongshida.

Hefei Rongshida Small Appliance Co., Ltd.

Founded in 2004, the company produces all kinds of small appliances.

Hefei Rongshida Electric Appliance Co., Ltd.

Founded in 2004, the company was originally a Sino-Korean joint venture. It mainly develops and produces Rongshida smart toilet seat covers. The company now is a Chinese sole proprietorship.

Hefei Rongshida Solar Energy Technology Co., Ltd.

Founded in 2004, the company mainly produces Rongshida solar water heaters and other relevant appliances.

Hefei Rongshida Water Industrial Equipment Co., Ltd.

Founded in 2005, the company specializes in the production of Rongshida water purifiers and water dispensers. Its affiliated enterprises set foot in other markets, such as the beverage and the small appliance industry.

Hefei Rongshida Vehicle Co., Ltd.

Founded in 2004, the company mainly produces Rongshida e-bikes and e-tricycles.

Zhongshan Rongshida Kitchen & Bathroom Electric Appliances Co., Ltd.

The company was founded in 2004. Its actual business entity is Zhongshan Nca Home Devices Co., Ltd., which mainly produces kitchen hoods, gas stoves, gas water heaters and cupboards.

References

External links 
 Whirlpool China (in Chinese)
 Hefei Rongshida Small Appliance (in Chinese)
 Hefei Rongshida Electric Appliance (in Chinese)
 Hefei Rongshida Solar Energy Technology (in Chinese)
 Hefei Rongshida Water Industrial Equipment (in Chinese)
 Hefei Rongshida Vehicle (in Chinese)
 Zhongshan Rongshida Kitchen & Bathroom Electric Appliances (in Chinese)

Home appliance manufacturers of China
Electronics companies of China
Hefei
Companies disestablished in 2011
Chinese companies established in 1985
Chinese brands
Home appliance brands